Gustavo E. Scuseria (born July 30, 1956) is the Robert A. Welch Professor of Chemistry, Professor of Physics & Astronomy and Professor of Materials Science & NanoEngineering at Rice University, Houston, TX. He is also editor-in-chief of the Journal of Chemical Theory and Computation.  Scuseria earned his PhD from the University of Buenos Aires in 1983 and conducted post-doctoral work at the University of California, Berkeley (1985-1987) and the University of Georgia (1987-1989) prior to joining the chemistry faculty at Rice University in 1989.

Group and research
Since 1989, more than 45 graduate students and 45 post-doctoral researchers have worked in the group, as well as a number of visiting scholars, summer researchers and undergraduate students. Research in the Scuseria group straddles quantum chemistry, condensed matter physics, and materials science, focusing on novel methods for electronic structure theory in molecules and solids, particularly strong correlation, and applications to molecules and materials of importance for energy and the environment. Professor Scuseria has made contributions to density functional theory, coupled cluster theory and the theory of carbon nanomaterials. Recent research thrusts in the group have focused on symmetry breaking and restoration, projected quasiparticle theory, projected Hartree-Fock theory, density embedding methods and pair coupled cluster theory. Scuseria's work has resulted in more than 450 peer-reviewed publications and 350 invited lectures at conferences and institutions all over the world.

Honors and awards
Scuseria's work has been recognized by a number of awards. These include the Oak Ridge Associated Universities Junior Faculty Award, the Camille and Henry Dreyfus Teacher-Scholar Award, an IBM Partnership Award, a John Simon Guggenheim Memorial Foundation Fellowship, a Creativity Extension Award from the Chemistry Division of the National Science Foundation, and the Feynman Prize in Nanotechnology Theory. Scuseria is a Fellow of the American Association for the Advancement of Science, the American Physical Society, the Royal Society of Chemistry, the American Chemical Society, and he is an elected member of the International Academy of Quantum Molecular Science, of which he has been Vice President since 2012. In 2016, Scuseria was listed as an ISI highly cited researcher.

References

1956 births
Living people
Rice University faculty
Fellows of the American Association for the Advancement of Science
Fellows of the American Physical Society
Fellows of the American Chemical Society
Fellows of the Royal Society of Chemistry
Academic journal editors
University of Buenos Aires alumni
Argentine expatriates in the United States